Florencia Cerutti Bogado (born 12 September 1982) is a Laser Radial sailor from Argentina, who made an official debut  for her sporting discipline at the 2008 Summer Olympics in Beijing. She placed twenty-second in the Laser Radial class, with a score of 125 points at the end of nine races.

Shortly after the Olympics, Cerutti had achieved a sixth-place position at the Palamos Christmas Race in Palamos, Spain.

She has had many coaching jobs around the world and currently teaches at Chicago Yacht Club in Chicago, IL, USA.

Notes

References

External links
 
 
 
 

1982 births
Living people
Olympic sailors of Paraguay
Paraguayan female sailors (sport)
Sailors at the 2008 Summer Olympics – Laser Radial